is an autobahn connecting the cities of Cologne and Bonn. It was constructed between 1929 and 1932, and opened to traffic on 6 August 1932.

Because it was the first public road that was limited to motorized vehicles and had no level crossings, it is commonly regarded as the oldest German Autobahn, even though it was only a country road at first and wasn't officially awarded Autobahn status until 1958. Until it was extended to six lanes between 1964 and 1966, there was no central barrier.

Except for deceleration at each end, the A 555 did not have a speed limit, resulting in about 15 km of mostly straight three-lane-road on flat terrain, enabling motorists to drive their vehicles at top speed. Especially at night, speeds in excess of 200 km/h were not unusual. In 2004, however, a speed limit was introduced around Wesseling for reasons of noise reduction, effectively cutting the area for legal speeding in half.

In Cologne, the A 555 spur has the by-name "Diplomatenrennbahn" (Diplomat race track), seemingly because foreign diplomats and state visitors liked to take a spin from Bonn to Cologne and back when Bonn still was the seat of government of West Germany. Bonn locals, however, use that term for the B 9 where diplomats regularly sped under protection of diplomatic immunity.

Exit list

 
 

  

|}

External links

555
A555